PAD or Portable Application Description is a machine-readable document format and specification designed by the  Association of Software Professionals and introduced in 1998. The PAD specification is utilized by more than 6,000 software publishers of downloadable applications covering the Windows, OS X, and Linux operating systems. PAD is a worldwide registered trademark of the Association of Software Professionals and managed by the ASP PAD Committee.

PAD allows software authors to provide standardized product descriptions and specifications to online sources in a standard way, using a simple XML schema that allows webmasters and program librarians to automate new program listings and update existing listings in their catalog. PAD saves time for both authors and webmasters, while allowing the specification to support the latest changes to operating systems and hardware.

PAD files most commonly have .XML or .PAD file name extension. PAD uses a simplified XML syntax that does not use name/value pairs in tags.  All tags are attribute-free.  The official PAD specification uses unique tags. To extract the fields in the official specification, it is not necessary to descend through the tag path.  If multiple languages are represented in a single PAD file, then correct parsing does require descending through the tag path because leaf tags are duplicated for each language supported.

Each field in the specification has a regular expression associated with it.  The regular expression acts as a constraint on the field: if it matches, the field value is legal and if it fails to match, the field and the PAD file as a whole do not conform to specification.  Only files where all fields in the file pass validation are properly called PAD files.

The most current specification, version 4.00, was announced on December 1, 2012, replacing the prior version, 3.11 which was previously announced on June 12, 2010.

Update to V4.0
The current version of PAD v4.0 was developed with the input and feedback of supporting members of the Association of Software Professionals, as it has been since 1998.

As part of the major upgrade to v4.0, ASP withdrew all its free tools while also formally requesting that all PAD editing, submission and related third party software, be removed or eliminated. In place of these prior third party and freeware tools, a new web-based platform was developed for PAD Specification by AppVisor.com. AppVisor allows publishers to upgrade their v3.1 PAD files to v4.0. 
However, the generated PAD file cannot be exported but only submitted directly to some directories. Submitting the XML Pad to websites costs $150 and approving the application/submission costs $36 per year.

Some software download and directory sites (BrotherSoft.com, Softonic.com, CNET Download.com, Softpedia.com) accept the PAD v4.0 format in addition to the older formats.

See also
Submission software

External links
 PAD site of the Association of Software Professionals
 PAD 4.0 Specification
  AppVisor — The Official PAD 4.0 Online Platform
 — The Official PAD Repository

References

Computer file formats
XML